Zemianske Kostoľany is a village and municipality in Prievidza District in the Trenčín Region of western Slovakia.

History
In historical records the village was first mentioned in 1331.

Geography
The municipality lies at an altitude of 236 metres and covers an area of 12.772 km². It has a population of about 1,683 people.

Environment
Zemianske Kostoľany is the location of the Nováky Power Plant lignite fired power station. This power station was ranked by the European Environment Agency as the industrial facility that is causing the highest damage costs to health and the environment in Slovakia and the 18th worst in the entire European Union.

References

Villages and municipalities in Prievidza District